Kim Hwa-Sook (Korean:김화숙; born March 2, 1971) is a South Korean team handball player and Olympic champion. She competed at the 1992 Summer Olympics in Barcelona, and won the gold medal with the Korean national team.

References

External links

1971 births
Living people
South Korean female handball players
Olympic handball players of South Korea
Handball players at the 1992 Summer Olympics
Olympic gold medalists for South Korea
Olympic medalists in handball
Medalists at the 1992 Summer Olympics